XS (Jenni Ognats) is a character appearing in media published by DC Comics, primarily as a member of the  Legion of Super-Heroes. She is the maternal granddaughter of Barry Allen (the second superhero known as the Flash), and cousin of Bart Allen (the second Kid Flash). Her first appearance is in Legionnaires #0 (Oct 1994).

Jessica Parker Kennedy portrayed a variation of the character in the fourth, fifth, seventh and eighth seasons of The CW Arrowverse television series The Flash. In this version XS is Nora West-Allen, and is Barry's daughter.

Fictional character biography
Despite being the granddaughter of Barry Allen (the Flash) and the daughter of Dawn Allen (one of the Tornado Twins), Jenni Ognats did not at first display any signs of super-speed.  However, the Dominators, knowing her family heritage, captured her. This did not keep her out of danger, due to the long-standing feud between the Allen line and the Thawne line. As a baby, she was held hostage by President Thawne, only escaping danger when several Allens backed down.

At the sight of her father Jeven Ognats of Aarok being tortured, her latent super-speed powers activated. She managed to escape with her father before stray fire from the Dominators caused their base to explode. After this, she checked herself into a laboratory to help her learn to coordinate herself at super-speed.  Once she learned control, she was drafted into the Legion of Super-Heroes.  She eventually learned to overcome her initial fear and nervousness, while she developed crushes on Cosmic Boy and, later, M'Onel, and eventually dated Dyrk Magz.

During the Legion's first trip to the 20th century, XS was separated from them. She met her cousin Bart Allen (Impulse), becoming a good friend. She revealed how she was participating in an archeological dig in the future. XS fought side by side with Impulse and other speedsters during the events of Dead Heat. Afterwards, the 27th century Flash fixed her grandfather's Cosmic Treadmill, enabling her to go home. Unfortunately, she overshot, encountering two further future incarnations of the Legion before returning. Impulse left her a goodbye note in the building that she was participating in excavating.

XS was one of the Legionnaires left behind after many of her teammates were lost, causing the team to be forcefully disbanded. She traveled to Xanthu with her teammate Star Boy, where she found herself caught in a war between Xanthu and Robotica. While the two Legionnaires managed to save millions of lives by distracting Robotica long enough for the surviving Xanthians to escape off-planet, the two remained trapped there for months thereafter, until rescued by their returned teammates.

XS and her version of the Legion were removed from mainstream DC continuity in the Teen Titans/Legion Special. They were revealed to be alive on in the parallel universe containing "Earth-247".

The Final Crisis: Legion of 3 Worlds miniseries reveals that the Tornado Twins and their family members (including XS) originated on the same Earth as the post-Infinite Crisis version of the Legion (which was introduced in "The Lightning Saga"). Thus, continuity revisions have been made: after Barry Allen's death in Crisis on Infinite Earths, the Twins and their families became the target of Professor Zoom, who was attempting to sabotage Don Allen and Meloni Thawne's marriage. Both families escaped to Earth-247 and the Twins died soon after in unknown circumstances. Both cousins were reunited with their grandmother Iris, and both also rapidly aged to teenagers within days. Presumably, XS' rapid-aging stabilized under her own volition, as she never showed signs of it during her tenure with the Legion.

XS is used by Brainiac 5 to revive her cousin, Bart Allen, culling his spirit from the Speed Force. The two then team up against Superboy-Prime. After the battle with Superboy-Prime and his Legion of Super-Villains, XS resigns from the Earth-247 Legion. Bart asks her to join him in the 21st Century, but she decides to stay in the 31st Century with the post-Infinite Crisis Legion to locate any of their surviving relatives. Her friend and teammate, Gates, also decides to stay to accompany her.

Powers and abilities
XS possesses Speed Force-based powers like the other members of her family (Barry Allen, Bart Allen, Wally West, and Iris West II). She can run at near-light speeds, vibrate through solid matter, and even time travel and cross dimensions by altering her molecular vibrational frequencies.

Equipment
As a member of the Legion of Super-Heroes she is provided a Legion Flight Ring. It allows her to fly and protects her from the vacuum of space and other dangerous environments.

In other media
XS makes a cameo appearance in the Legion of Super Heroes episode "Dark Victory".
XS appears in Adventures in the DC Universe #10, a series that was published before the DC Animated Universe expanded with Superman: The Animated Series and Justice League. As such, most events in the series are contradicted by the television series and later comics, and this character can be considered apocryphal.
Jessica Parker Kennedy portrays a variation of XS in the live-action television series The Flash. This version is Nora West-Allen, the daughter of Barry Allen and Iris West-Allen from the year 2049 whose characterization is an amalgamation of the comics' XS and Dawn Allen. First appearing in the crossover "Crisis on Earth-X" posing as a caterer, she is credited as a "mystery girl" in season four before becoming a main character in season five and a recurring character in season seven.
 Another character named Jenna appears as the daughter of Joe West and Cecile Horton.

References

External links
 Unofficial Biography at DCUGuide.com
 History & Significant Appearances at Hyperborea.org
 Entry at World of Black Heroes
 A Hero History Of XS at MajorSpoilers.com

Characters created by Jeff Moy
Comics characters introduced in 1994
DC Comics characters who can move at superhuman speeds
DC Comics characters with accelerated healing
DC Comics characters with superhuman senses
DC Comics female superheroes
DC Comics metahumans 
Fictional characters who can manipulate time
Fictional characters with dimensional travel abilities
Fictional characters who can manipulate sound
Fictional characters who can turn intangible
Fictional characters with air or wind abilities
Fictional characters with density control abilities
Flash (comics) characters
Time travelers